The Haunted House is a 1928 American mystery film directed by Benjamin Christensen. The film stars Larry Kent and Thelma Todd and is based on Owen Davis's 1926 Broadway play of the same name. As of 2020, UCLA Film and Television Archive has a copy of the film.

Plot
A group of heirs to a family fortune are summoned to an old dark house to attend the reading of a will. Weird events occur, leading the group to believe the house is haunted. The house features sliding panels, hidden rooms, weird attendants and even a mad scientist. It turns out to be just a gang of crooks trying to scare them off before they can inherit their money.

Cast

Background
After his success in Europe with his 1922 film Haxan, director Christensen relocated to Hollywood in 1926, where he directed Thelma Todd in The Devil's Circus who would appear again in The Haunted House. The screenplay for the film was written by Lajos Biro and Benjamin Christensen who used the name Richard Bee.
Production started on the film on July 26, 1928. The Haunted House was Christensen's first attempt at using sound in filme with the feature containing sound effects and a music score, in addition to Eve Southern mouthing two songs in the film which according to an article in Variety, were added in post-production. Variety also noted that the synchronization of the songs was "badly handled, with the player and the sound always out of kilter and neither starting out for finishing together."

Release
The Haunted House was released on November 4, 1928. The film was released as both a silent feature and a feature with the sound additions.

Reception
From contemporary reviews, Variety felt the film "played legitimately and with no attempt to get a tongue-in-the cheek laugh. It holds every form of sliding panel and rainstorm mystery material, as did the play, but holds it all with deadly seriousness." The review felt overall it was not as "good a film as another recent boogy-man thriller, The Terror." A review in Photoplay commented that the film was "Too much Chester Conklin and not enough mystery" Film Daily praised camera work by Sol Polito, declaring him "a genius on atmospheric effects" concluding that the film had "thrills and laughs" in "abundance" despite "the plot standing still for several reels." The film was reviewed twice in The Film Spectator, with the first reviewer stating that The Haunted House was "a resume of all the mystery thrillers ever done, but it can be heartily recommended as entertaining, since its undoubtedly the best to burst fort in all its horror". The second review found the film to be "a clever picture" with Christensen giving "an eerie quality to his characters, an intelligent treatment of a story that is designed to give brave men goose-flesh and make cowards shriek". Harrison's Reports found the reviewer would be "held in tense suspense. Here and there the action shows some tendency to lag for those that are hard-boiled, but the general public seemed to enjoy it immensely. Children may get scared out of their wits by the mysterious happenings."

References

Footnotes

Sources

External links
 
 
 
 Vitaphone Varieties Collection at the archive.org

1928 films
1928 mystery films
American mystery films
American silent feature films
American black-and-white films
American films based on plays
Films directed by Benjamin Christensen
First National Pictures films
Lost American films
Transitional sound films
1920s American films
Silent mystery films